Andrés Gabriel Ferrada Moreira (born 10 June 1969) is a Chilean archbishop of the Catholic Church. Since 8 September 2021 he has been the Secretary of the Congregation for the Clergy, where he had worked since 2018. From 2006 to 2018 he worked in his native diocese of Santiago de Chile.

Biography
Andrés Gabriel Ferrada Moreira was born in Santiago de Chile on 10 June 1969. He was ordained a priest of the Archdiocese of Santiago on 3 July 1999. He studied for several years in Rome and earned a doctorate in theology at the Pontifical Gregorian University in 2006. In addition to pastoral assignments in that archdiocese, he was director of studies and prefect of theology at the Seminario Pontificio Mayor de los Santos Ángeles Custodios.

Ferrada's years in Santiago were marked by his association with Father Fernando Karadima, the charismatic leader of a group called the Priestly Union of the Sacred Heart, whom a 2011 Vatican investigation found guilty of sexually assault minors and abusing his authority, leading to his laicization in 2018. Ferrada met Karadima when he was 19, eventually joined his Union, and had Karadima as his spiritual adviser. He spoke weekly with Karadima while studying in Rome for five years. In 2010, Ferrada and several other priests, including his brother, disassociated themselves from Karadima saying they found accusations of sexual abuse on the part of Karadima credible. Ferrada later testified in court in support of victims of sexual abuse by Karadima, saying he had witnessed Karadima's abuse of power and unwanted sexual advances since the mid-1990s "but no one ever did anything about it". In defending himself against charges of spiritual manipulation, Karadima said Ferrada "has a difficult character and is somewhat reckless".

He joined the staff of the Congregation for the Clergy in 2018. On 8 September 2021, Pope Francis appointed him secretary of that Congregation, effective 1 October, and titular archbishop of Tiburnia. He was consecrated a bishop by Pope Francis on 17 October 2021.

References

External links
  

1969 births
Living people
People from Santiago
Officials of the Roman Curia
Chilean Roman Catholic bishops
Bishops appointed by Pope Francis
21st-century Roman Catholic archbishops
Pontifical Gregorian University alumni
Roman Catholic titular archbishops